Arkelloceras is an early Middle Jurassic (Bajocian stage) Stephanoceratoid (Ammonitina) genus from arctic Canada, Alaska, and Siberia belonging to the family Otoitidae (Imlay 1984, Westermann 1965)

Arkelloceras seems to be a direct descendant of Abbasites and is thought to have given rise to Ermoceras and possibly to Thamboceras. (Westermann 1965)

References

 Imlay, Ralph W. 1984. Early and Middle Bajocian (Middle Jurassic) Ammonites from Southern Alaska;U.S.G.S PP 1322 
 Westermann, G. E. G. 1965.Septal and Sutural Patterns in Evolution and Taxonomy of Thamboceratidae and Clydoniceratidae (M Jurassic Ammonitina). Jour of Paleontology 39(5)864-874, Sept.

Jurassic ammonites